Mir Muhammad Usman Badini is a Pakistani politician who had been a member of the National Assembly of Pakistan from August 2017 to May 2018.

Political career
He ran for the seat of Senate of Pakistan as an independent candidate in 2009 Pakistani Senate election but was unsuccessful.

He re-ran for the seat of Senate of Pakistan as an independent candidate in 2012 Pakistani Senate election but was unsuccessful.

He was elected to the National Assembly of Pakistan as a candidate of Jamiat Ulema-e-Islam (F) (JUI-F) from Constituency NA-260 (Quetta-cum-Chagai-cum-Nushki-cum-Mastung) in by-polls held in July 2017. He received 43,191 votes and defeated  Mir Bahadur Khan, a candidate of the Balochistan National Party (BNP).

References

Living people
Baloch people
Politicians from Quetta
Jamiat Ulema-e-Islam (F) politicians
Pakistani MNAs 2013–2018
Year of birth missing (living people)